Daulatpur Thana is a thana of Khulna District in the Division of Khulna, Bangladesh.

Geography
It has 17097 households and total area 7.69 km2.

Demographics
In the 1991 Bangladesh census, Daulatpur had a population of 81,186. Males constituted 55% of the population, and females 45%. The population older than 18 was 45,691. Daulatpur had an average literacy rate of 60.4% (7+ years), higher than the national average of 32.4%.

, the population was 112,442.

Administration
Daulatpur has 2 Unions/Wards, 37 Mauzas/Mahallas, and 0 villages.

See also
 Upazilas of Bangladesh
 Districts of Bangladesh
 Divisions of Bangladesh

References

Upazilas of Khulna District